Joseph Vincent Flacco (born January 16, 1985) is an American football quarterback who is a free agent. He played college football at Delaware after transferring from Pittsburgh and was drafted by the Baltimore Ravens in the first round of the 2008 NFL Draft. Flacco has also played for the Denver Broncos and Philadelphia Eagles. 

Flacco was Baltimore's starting quarterback from 2008 until midway through the 2018 season, and helped lead the Ravens to the playoffs six times; during his tenure in Baltimore the Ravens won the AFC North twice, appeared in three AFC Championship Games, and beat the San Francisco 49ers to win Super Bowl XLVII following the 2012 season. Flacco was named Super Bowl XLVII's MVP, concluding a postseason run in which he tied Joe Montana's single postseason record for touchdown passes (11) without an interception. That off-season, he signed a six-year contract worth $120.6 million, a record high for a quarterback at the time. Following a 2014 campaign that saw his career high 27 touchdowns and nearly 4,000 passing yards, Flacco received a Pro Bowl invitation, but he turned it down as his wife was giving birth to one of his children the same weekend.

By 2017, Flacco's performance began to decline, and he was eventually traded to the Denver Broncos in 2019 after a hip injury caused him to lose his starting position to Lamar Jackson. A neck injury eight games into the 2019 season ended his playing year prematurely and he was released by the Broncos after the team chose to start Drew Lock. He subsequently joined the New York Jets to back up Sam Darnold before becoming a starter for the Jets. He signed with the Philadelphia Eagles that offseason but was traded back to the Jets after the latter lost starter Zach Wilson. He was resigned by the Jets for the 2022 season.

As of the 2022 NFL season, Flacco has the most career passing yards and touchdowns for any quarterback who has never been to a Pro Bowl (he was invited to the 2015 Pro Bowl following the 2014 season, but declined). Flacco is also known for having one of the strongest arms in the NFL.

Early years
Flacco was born on January 16, 1985 in Audubon, New Jersey, the eldest of five sons to Karen (née Madden) and Steve Flacco. Flacco has four younger brothers. The Flacco family is originally from Haddon Township, New Jersey. Flacco played football, baseball, and basketball at Audubon High School and was the starting quarterback for the Green Wave. Regarded as a three-star recruit by Rivals.com, Flacco was listed as No. 39 among quarterback prospects in the class of 2003.

College career

Pittsburgh
Flacco was redshirted as a freshman for the Pittsburgh Panthers football team that went 8–5 in 2003.

In 2004, Flacco was the backup quarterback behind starter Tyler Palko, who led the team to an 8–4 record. He saw action in three games against Ohio University, University of Nebraska, and the University of South Florida. Flacco threw only four passes and finished the season with one completion for 11 yards and a 25-yard punt.

Delaware

Flacco transferred to the University of Delaware in 2005, but was not eligible to play that season. He saw his first full-time action during the 2006 season, throwing for 2,783 yards, 18 touchdowns and 10 interceptions. Delaware's Fightin' Blue Hens ultimately struggled to a 5–6 record and failed to qualify for the FCS playoffs.

In the 2007 season, Flacco led his team to an 8–3 regular-season record while compiling 4,263 yards, 23 touchdowns and 5 interceptions. Arguably his best game came against Navy where he threw for 434 yards and four touchdowns. Flacco showed another solid performance in the first-ever meeting against the Delaware State Hornets in the first round of the playoffs. Behind Omar Cuff's record-setting day, Flacco threw efficiently for 189 yards and a touchdown, leading the Blue Hens to an easy 44–7 victory. Flacco continued Delaware's playoff run by upsetting the Northern Iowa Panthers 39–27 in the FCS quarterfinals and upsetting the Southern Illinois Salukis 20–17 the next weekend in the semifinals. Flacco threw two touchdowns to win against both the Panthers and Salukis, but went on to lose in the FCS National Championship Game to the Appalachian State Mountaineers 49–21. 

Flacco set 20 school records during his career at Delaware.

College statistics

Professional career

At Delaware, Flacco was pessimistic about his chances to play in the NFL, and after his junior year asked his coach for permission to play baseball. The coach predicted that he would be selected in the NFL Draft, surprising Flacco. With a solid showing at the Senior Bowl and NFL Combine, Flacco solidified himself as a top five quarterback in the 2008 NFL Draft. Flacco won the long distance throw competition in ESPN's State Farm College Football All-Star Challenge with a 74-yard throw, beating out Matt Ryan, Colt Brennan, Chad Henne, and John David Booty, later winning the Taco Bell Quarterback Scramble with a time of 15.72 seconds.

Members of the Baltimore Ravens' front office, having attended Flacco's workout at the Senior Bowl, were impressed by his ability to throw in rainy and windy conditions. Flacco again impressed the Ravens' personnel in the poor weather conditions of his workout at Delaware, despite their low expectations given Delaware's small-school pedigree—Flacco performed the workout on an uncut, unlined field with his own footballs. Ravens assistant general manager Eric DeCosta later stated the workouts left him confident Flacco could succeed in the late-season conditions in Pittsburgh and Cleveland.

Baltimore Ravens
Flacco was drafted by the Ravens as the 18th overall pick in the 2008 NFL Draft after the team traded out of the eighth overall selection to the 26th, then up again. The selection made Flacco the highest drafted player ever from the University of Delaware. He was also the first Division I-FCS (formerly I-AA) quarterback selected in the first round of the draft since Steve McNair went third overall to the Houston Oilers in the 1995 NFL Draft. Draft commentators initially criticized the pick as a "reach", feeling Flacco would likely have still been available in the middle of the second round. DeCosta, however, stated waiting was too much of a gamble and that choosing Flacco in the first round was "an easy decision to make."

On July 16, 2008, he signed a five-year contract with a maximum value of around $30 million, and $8.75 million guaranteed.

He played for the Ravens for 11 seasons, from 2008 to 2018, becoming renowned as one of the league’s top quarterbacks.

2008 season

Due to a season-ending injury to incumbent starter Kyle Boller and an illness to former Heisman Trophy winner Troy Smith, Flacco became the starting quarterback in the 2008 season opener against the Cincinnati Bengals. He completed 15 of 29 passes for 129 yards, his longest pass being a 15-yard play to Derrick Mason. He threw no touchdowns and no interceptions in his debut, but he had a 38-yard rushing touchdown, which was the longest rushing touchdown by a quarterback in Ravens' franchise history at the time (the record has since been broken several times by Lamar Jackson). Flacco's touchdown put the Ravens up by 17–3; the team eventually won the game 17–10.

In his first season, Flacco was named AFC Offensive Player of the Week in Week 9, NFL Rookie of the week, the NFLPA Rookie of the week, and NFL Rookie of the Month for November. Flacco finished his rookie season 257/428 for 2,971 yards with a total of 16 touchdowns (14 passing, 2 rushing), and 14 turnovers (12 interceptions and 2 lost fumbles).

In the wild card round of the 2008–09 NFL playoffs, Flacco became only the third rookie quarterback in NFL history to win his first post-season start, and the first to do it on the road, when the Ravens defeated the Miami Dolphins, 27–9. Flacco completed 9-of-23 attempted passes, accumulating 135 yards without throwing a touchdown or interception. He also scored the victory-sealing rushing touchdown on a quarterback draw in the 4th quarter. Shaun King, Ben Roethlisberger, Russell Wilson, Mark Sanchez, and most recently Brock Purdy are the only other rookie quarterbacks to ever win their debut playoff game.

He then won his second game against the Tennessee Titans. Flacco led the Ravens to a 13–10 win in the divisional playoff round. Flacco made tight-window throws to Todd Heap and Mark Clayton on the go ahead scoring drive in the 4th quarter to set up a game-winning field goal from Matt Stover. On the day, Flacco was 11-of-22 for 148 yards and a touchdown, without turning the ball over for the second straight game. He became the first rookie quarterback to win two playoff games.

In the AFC Championship Game versus the Pittsburgh Steelers, the Ravens lost 14–23, with Flacco throwing for 141 yards, being sacked three times and throwing three interceptions, one being the game clincher to Troy Polamalu, who returned the pass for a touchdown.

Flacco was named the Diet Pepsi NFL Rookie of the Year in January 2009.

2009 season

In the season opening game in Baltimore against the Kansas City Chiefs, Flacco led the Ravens to their first win of the season. He threw for 307 yards and three touchdowns, both career highs, along with 18 yards rushing. He also threw one interception and had a quarterback rating of 95.8. During this game, the Ravens broke the franchise record for most offensive yards in a game with a total of 501.

In Week 15 against the Chicago Bears, Flacco broke his personal record for most touchdowns thrown in a game with four, while throwing for 234 passing yards and completing 72 percent of his passes, earning him a career-high passer rating of 135.6. The Ravens would go on to win the game 31–7. With 3,613 yards and 21 touchdowns, Flacco became the first Ravens quarterback since Vinny Testaverde to throw for more than 3,000 yards and 20 touchdowns in a single season. He also tied his interception number from his rookie season of 12.

An injury limited Flacco's performance on Wild Card Weekend against the New England Patriots. The Ravens routed the Patriots 33–14 despite Flacco throwing 4-of-10 for just 34 yards and one interception.

2010 season

In the season opener, Flacco and the Ravens opened New Meadowlands Stadium against the New York Jets. Flacco threw for 248 yards while completing 52.6% of his passes, throwing one interception and losing a fumble. In a defensive contest, the Ravens came away with the 10–9 win over their former defensive coordinator Rex Ryan.

In Week 2 at the Cincinnati Bengals, Flacco had arguably his worst NFL start of his young career, throwing for 154 yards while completing just 43.6% of his passes and throwing a career-high four interceptions, while throwing one touchdown and accumulating a passer rating of 23.8. Coming off of the worst start of his career, Flacco and the Ravens had their home opener against the Cleveland Browns. Flacco bounced back from his Week 2 loss to the Bengals and had his best game of the young season, throwing for 262 yards and completing 71% of his passes. He then hooked up with prized offseason acquisition wide receiver Anquan Boldin for three touchdowns while throwing no interceptions and accumulating a passer rating of 128.7. The Ravens won the game 24–17.

On December 26, 2010, with a win against the Cleveland Browns, Flacco became one of only four NFL quarterbacks to lead his team to the playoffs in all three of his first three seasons. During this game, Flacco reached 10,000 career passing yards. Ending the season, Flacco set season highs in passing yards (3,622), passing touchdowns (25), passer rating (93.6), and a season low in interceptions (10), yet set a career-high with four lost fumbles.

In defeating the Kansas City Chiefs (30–7) in the Wild Card Round of the 2010–11 NFL playoffs, Flacco completed 25 of 34 passes for 265 yards, two touchdowns, and no interceptions, for a post-season-high passer rating of 115.4. With the win, Flacco became the first quarterback in NFL history to start and win a playoff game in each of his first three seasons, and tied Len Dawson, Roger Staubach, Jake Delhomme, and Mark Sanchez for most career post-season road wins by a quarterback.

In the Divisional Round, Flacco and the Ravens would once again head to Pittsburgh to play their arch-rival Steelers. The difference this time would be the season was on the line. The Ravens got out to an early 21–7 lead after a 12-yard rush by running back Ray Rice, a fumble recovery run back for a touchdown by defensive end Cory Redding, and a four-yard touchdown pass from Flacco to tight end Todd Heap. But in the third quarter, which the Ravens had been dominant in all of the regular season, Baltimore fell apart. The Ravens turned the ball over three times in their own territory with an uncharacteristic fumble by Rice, an interception by Flacco, and a fumbled snap by center Matt Birk (Flacco was credited with the lost fumble), and with those the Steelers took a 31–24 lead. But even after all of the Ravens miscues and errors, the Ravens still had a shot to tie it at the end when Flacco threw a dart to T.J. Houshmandzadeh on 4th and 18, but it was dropped. Flacco finished the game 16-of-30 for 125 yards, one touchdown, and one interception. He was ranked 90th by his fellow players on the NFL Top 100 Players of 2011.

2011 season
Flacco had his best game of the season in Week 3 against the St. Louis Rams. He went 27-of-48 with a season-high 389 yards through the air and three touchdowns, all in the first quarter and to rookie wideout Torrey Smith (who actually finished the game with a five catch, 152-yard breakout performance). Flacco had a 103.6 rating, as well as 27 yards rushing and a lost fumble. The Ravens scored a season-high 37 points in the 30-point blowout victory, and also gained a franchise record 553 offensive yards.

Flacco had three more 300-yard games during the regular season: against the Houston Texans, Arizona Cardinals, and Steelers. He won all three of these games, sweeping Pittsburgh for the first time in his career, but also lost fumbles in each one. Despite losing to the San Diego Chargers in Week 15, the Ravens clinched the playoffs for the fourth straight year that week. The Ravens clinched their division, along with the number 2 seed in the AFC, in a Week 17 win over the rival Cincinnati Bengals. Flacco threw for 130 yards and a touchdown.

Flacco finished the season starting all 16 games. He had 312 completions on 542 attempts (57.6%). He threw for 3,610 yards, 20 touchdowns, 12 interceptions, and had one rushing score. He averaged 225.6 yards per game, was sacked 31 times over the course of the season and set a new career high with six lost fumbles. He finished the year with an 80.9 QB rating.

Flacco continued his playoff dominance that year. In the Divisional Round against the Houston Texans, he threw for 176 yards and two touchdowns, with no turnovers. In the AFC Championship, Flacco completed 22 out of his 36 attempts while throwing for two touchdowns and one interception along with 306 yards passing. These stats were enough to outplay New England Patriots quarterback Tom Brady, who threw for 67 fewer yards, two fewer touchdowns, and one more interception than Flacco. Despite Flacco's performance, the Patriots won to advance to the Super Bowl.

2012 season: Super Bowl MVP
On the NFL Network's Top 100 Players of 2012 list, Flacco was ranked 74th by his fellow players. Despite Flacco's success—the Ravens were in the playoffs each of his first four seasons—few saw him as among the NFL's best quarterbacks. Before January 2015, he had never been selected for the Pro Bowl. In April 2012, Flacco was, as The New York Times later stated, "almost universally mocked" when he stated that he was the best quarterback in the NFL, superior to Brady, Peyton Manning, or Aaron Rodgers. "I don’t think I’d be very successful at my job if I didn’t feel that way", Flacco said. In July, he turned down the Ravens’ offer of a new contract, reportedly for $16 million a year, telling his agent that he believed he could improve and earn more.

In the opening week, Flacco passed for 299 yards and two touchdowns in a 44–13 victory over the Cincinnati Bengals to earn his second AFC Offensive Player of the Week honor. By Week 11, the Ravens had amassed a 9–2 record. Flacco played poorly, however, once again in a Week 12 rematch with the Steelers, completing only 16 of 34 passes for 188 yards with one touchdown and an interception. The game saw the Ravens squander a ten-point lead and lose 20–23, despite their division rival starting backup Charlie Batch at quarterback. The following week against the Washington Redskins, Flacco went 16-of-21 with three touchdowns but again amassed less than 200 passing yards in the season's first back-to-back losses. With the offense remaining inconsistent and the team missing opportunities to win their division with each loss, offensive coordinator Cam Cameron was unexpectedly fired and replaced by quarterbacks coach – and former Indianapolis Colts head coach – Jim Caldwell. The change at coordinator was followed by a lopsided loss to the Denver Broncos, leading to widespread criticism of Flacco in the media.

Flacco and the Ravens responded with a decisive 33–14 win over the defending Super Bowl-champion New York Giants in which Flacco threw for 309 yards and two touchdowns, with another rushing. Despite the victory over New York, much of the local and national media wrote the team off as Super Bowl contenders, with ESPN writing that the team had "backed into the playoffs with a disastrous December."

On January 6, 2013, in the Wild Card round against the Indianapolis Colts, Flacco finished the game 12 of 23 for 282 yards, two touchdowns, and a career postseason high 125.6 passer rating. The 24–9 win at home set up a Divisional round rematch with the Broncos, who entered the game as nine-point favorites after their regular season win over the Ravens, which included a 98-yard interception touchdown return by Broncos' cornerback Chris Harris that marked the lowest point of Flacco's season. Continuing his postseason success, Flacco played one of the best games in his career, throwing for 331 yards and 3 touchdowns. In the fourth quarter, the Ravens were down 35–28 and had one last chance to tie the game. After an incomplete pass and a 7-yard scramble, on 3rd down and 3, with the clock running and less than 45 seconds remaining in regulation with no timeouts, Flacco heaved a 70-yard touchdown pass to Jacoby Jones, sending the game into overtime. The pass has been called the "Mile High Miracle", and "one of the greatest plays in NFL history" and drew comparisons to Roger Staubach's "Hail Mary", Terry Bradshaw's "Immaculate Reception", and Joe Montana's "The Catch". The Ravens would go on to win the game in double overtime 38–35 after an interception by Corey Graham from Peyton Manning and a 47-yard field goal from Justin Tucker, sending the Ravens to face the New England Patriots in the AFC Championship for a second straight year.

On January 20, 2013, Flacco and the Ravens avenged the previous year's AFC Championship Game loss to the New England Patriots with a 28–13 win, securing their spot in the 2013 Super Bowl. Flacco threw for 240 yards and three touchdowns, notching his third straight game with a passer rating over 100. With this win, Flacco became the second NFL quarterback to defeat both Peyton Manning (with the Broncos) and Tom Brady in the same postseason since both became starting quarterbacks in 2001 (the first to do so was Mark Sanchez in 2010).

On February 3, 2013, the Ravens faced the San Francisco 49ers in Super Bowl XLVII. The 49ers were a 4-point favorite to win the game, but Flacco completed 22 of 33 passes for 287 yards and three touchdowns to lead the Ravens to a 34–31 win. Flacco’s three touchdowns in the game tied him for first place on the list of most consecutive playoff games with at least three touchdown passes (3 games). With a record fourth playoff game with a 100+ passer rating in a single postseason, Flacco was named the game's Most Valuable Player and was awarded a brand-new 2014 Chevrolet Corvette.

Flacco finished the postseason having completed 73-of-126 (57.9 percent) passes for 1,140 yards with 11 touchdowns and zero interceptions, tying Montana and Kurt Warner for the most touchdowns in a single postseason and additionally tying Montana for the most touchdowns without an interception in a single postseason. Flacco's 117.2 passer rating tied him for third place all-time with Steve Young in a Super Bowl-winning postseason.

These accomplishments gave Flacco what The New York Times stated, "might be the best start to a player's free agency in the history of professional sports", as his contract expired after the season. He was ranked 19th by his fellow players on the NFL Top 100 Players of 2013.

2013 season
On March 4, 2013, Flacco became the highest-paid quarterback in NFL history when he signed a six-year contract worth $120.6 million. However, within months, he was surpassed by the Packers' Aaron Rodgers and the Falcons' Matt Ryan.

Flacco's 2013 season was statistically the worst of his career. For the first time as an NFL quarterback, Flacco threw more interceptions than touchdowns. His 22 interceptions in the season were 10 more than he had thrown in any other season. His 19 touchdowns were also his lowest since his rookie year. His passer rating was a career low 73.1, approximately 7 points lower than Flacco's previous worst season passer rating. He was also sacked more times (48) than he was in any other season in his career. Despite all this, he also set a high in passing yards, with 3,912. The Ravens finished 8–8 for the season and Flacco missed the playoffs for the first time in his career. He was ranked 58th by his fellow players on the NFL Top 100 Players of 2014.

2014 season

In their 2014 season home opener, the Ravens played against the division rival Cincinnati Bengals. The game saw the Ravens trailing practically the entire time; however, their one lead of the game came off of an 80-yard touchdown pass from Flacco to wide receiver Steve Smith Sr. At the time, it was the longest touchdown throw of Flacco's career. However, the Ravens would go on to lose the game 16–23, after Bengals' quarterback Andy Dalton connected with receiver A. J. Green for an even more stupendous 77-yard touchdown that would ultimately be the game winner. It would be the first time since 2005 that the Ravens lost their home opener. Flacco finished the game completing 35 of 62 passes and throwing for a season-high 345 passing yards along with a touchdown and an interception, with a passer rating of 71.0.

Flacco had his best game of the season in Week 6, and one of the best games of his career. He completed 21 of 28 passes for 306 yards and a career-high five touchdown passes to four different receivers (Smith Sr., Torrey Smith, Kamar Aiken, and Michael Campanaro) with no interceptions. He once again wasn't sacked and had a season-high passer rating of 149.7. Flacco became the fastest quarterback to throw five touchdown passes, as it only took him 16 minutes and 3 seconds. The Ravens blew out the Tampa Bay Buccaneers 48–17. He earned AFC Offensive Player of the Week honors for the third time in his career.

In Week 16, the Ravens took on the Houston Texans with a chance to clinch the playoffs. Flacco played his worst game of the season, and arguably the worst of his career. He ended the first half with only 27 passing yards and two interceptions, as the Ravens trailed 0–16 going into halftime. The Ravens would rally in the second half, as Flacco threw two touchdown passes to Torrey Smith, but the Ravens never held a lead in the entire game and ended up losing 13–25. Flacco finished completing 21 of 50 passes for 195 yards, two touchdowns and three interceptions with a season-low passer rating of 41.7. He was also sacked twice.

In Week 17, the Ravens took on the Cleveland Browns in Baltimore. They had the chance to clinch the final playoff seed, but they needed a win and for the Kansas City Chiefs to beat or tie the San Diego Chargers. Trailing 10–6 in the fourth quarter, Flacco stepped up big time, heaving a deep pass to Torrey Smith, who caught the ball at the Browns' 16 yard line. On the next play of the game, Flacco connected with Smith again, this time for a touchdown, which put the Ravens up 13–10 for good with 7:33 left in the game. With 3:44 left in the game, Flacco threw another touchdown pass to Kamar Aiken, sealing a 20–10 win. Kansas City would beat San Diego 19–7, giving Baltimore the final AFC playoff spot. Flacco finished the game with 22 of 36 completed passes, 312 passing yards, 2 touchdowns and no interceptions with a passer rating of 107.6. Flacco was also sacked one time, which caused one of his two fumbles in the game (he did not lose either).

2014 saw Flacco have the best regular season of his career. He set highs in passing yards (3,986), passing touchdowns (27), times sacked (19), fumbles (5), and fumbles lost (0). He also attempted and completed the second most single-season passes in his career (344 completions out of 554 attempts) and tied his mark for second fewest interceptions thrown in a regular season (12). From Weeks 2 through 4, Flacco was not sacked at all. In 5 of Flacco's last 6 games of the season, his passer rating was 99 or higher, with the one exception being the 13–25 loss to Houston. He led Baltimore to a 10–6 record.

In the Wild Card round of the playoffs, the Ravens faced the AFC North-winning Pittsburgh Steelers at Heinz Field. Flacco completed 18 of 29 passes for 259 yards, two touchdowns and no interceptions with a passer rating of 114.0, as the Ravens beat the Steelers 30–17. He was sacked once, after getting tripped up by his offensive lineman on the Ravens' first offensive play of the game. This became the first time that the Ravens beat the Steelers in the postseason. Flacco also continued his streak of winning a game in his team's first round of the playoffs. His biggest accomplishment, however, may have been that he became the first quarterback in NFL history to start and win a playoff game in six of their first seven seasons.

In the Divisional round of the playoffs, the Ravens traveled to Foxborough to take on the number-one seeded New England Patriots, where they lost to the eventual Super Bowl champions in a 35–31 shootout, despite two back-to-back 14-point leads. Flacco still performed well, going 28/45 with 292 passing yards, a career-postseason-high 4 touchdown passes, 2 interceptions and a 92.1 passer rating. Once again, he was not sacked.

For his efforts during the 2014 season, Flacco was invited to the 2015 Pro Bowl as an alternate but turned down the opportunity to play because his wife, Dana, was due to give birth to the couple's third child the same month.

On the NFL Top 100 Players of 2015, Flacco was ranked number 97, the lowest that he has ever been ranked, on the NFL's Top 100 Players list. He fell 39 spots from the previous year, where he was ranked number 58.

2015 season

The Ravens began their 2015 season in a road game against the Denver Broncos, the place where Flacco had his breakout playoff performance nearly three years earlier. Leading the game, 13–9, with less than a minute left in the third quarter, Flacco threw a pass down the middle of the field, aiming for Steve Smith Sr., but missed the pass terribly, as it was intercepted by Broncos cornerback Aqib Talib and returned 51 yards for a touchdown. It was Flacco's first pick-six since the 2013 season finale. With less than a minute left in the game, the Ravens had the ball at the Denver 16-yard line and were trailing, 19–13. Flacco threw a pass into the end zone, intended for double-covered tight end Crockett Gillmore, which was intercepted by safety, and former Raven, Darian Stewart, officially ending the game for Baltimore.

In Week 2, against the Oakland Raiders, Flacco bounced back by going 32-of-45 with 384 yards and two touchdown passes to Crockett Gillmore, with a 102.5 passer rating. However, while trying to rally the Ravens back at the end of the game, he was picked off by cornerback Neiko Thorpe with less than 30 seconds left, giving the Raiders a 37–33 upset win. It was the first time in his NFL career that Flacco started a season with a 0–2 record.

On the final drive of the Ravens' Week 11 game versus the St. Louis Rams, Flacco suffered a torn ACL and MCL, ending his 2015 season. He stayed in the game to complete the drive and put Baltimore into a position to kick the game-winning field goal, giving the Ravens a 16–13 win at home. 

The Ravens had a 3–7 record with Flacco at starting quarterback. Flacco finished the season with 266 completed passes out of 413 attempts, 2,791 yards, 14 touchdowns, 12 interceptions, an 83.1 passer rating, three rushing touchdowns and five fumbles, losing two. Flacco's injury ended his streak of consecutive starts at 122 games.

2016 season
On March 2, 2016, Flacco agreed to a three-year extension to remain with the team. After their Week 3 victory against the Jacksonville Jaguars, Flacco and the Ravens had accrued a 3–0 record, their best record after three games since 2009, but the Ravens would struggle down the stretch, finishing with an 8–8 record and missing the playoffs for the second straight season, the first consecutive playoff misses for the franchise since 2004–2005. Flacco posted a career-high and franchise record 4,317 passing yards, the first time he reached at least 4,000 yards, but only threw 20 touchdowns and 15 interceptions, the second highest of his career. Flacco posted a 6.4 average per attempt, tying his career worst. Flacco also completed a career-high and franchise best 436 completions, and a career-high and franchise best 672 attempts. The 672 pass attempts currently rank fifth most in a single season in league history. The longest touchdown pass of his career came in Week 9 of the 2016 season against the Pittsburgh Steelers. In the first quarter of the game, Flacco's short pass to Mike Wallace went for a 95-yard touchdown, and is the longest pass play in Ravens history.

2017 season
On July 26, 2017, it was revealed that Flacco was diagnosed with a back injury, ruling him out for 3–6 weeks of training camp. Against the Miami Dolphins in Week 8, Flacco suffered a concussion after a hit from Kiko Alonso. Flacco left the game, and was relieved by Ryan Mallett for the rest. The Ravens nevertheless won 40–0. The Ravens finished the season with a 9–7 record and just missed the playoffs after losing 31–27 to the Cincinnati Bengals in Week 17, allowing the Buffalo Bills to qualify for the postseason. Flacco finished the season starting all 16 games, throwing for 3,141 yards and 18 touchdowns with 13 interceptions.

2018 season: Final year in Baltimore
On September 9, 2018, Flacco threw for three touchdowns and had a passer rating of 121.7 in the season-opening blowout against the Buffalo Bills 47–3. The next week he recorded 376 yards and two touchdowns along with two interceptions against the Cincinnati Bengals, losing his seventh game in Cincinnati. He fumbled the ball in the fourth quarter, ending the chance for a comeback.

After suffering a hip injury during a Week 9 loss to the Pittsburgh Steelers, Flacco was replaced by rookie Lamar Jackson as the Ravens' starting quarterback. Jackson performed well going 6–1 at the helm, and Flacco served in a backup role for the first time in his NFL career after he was cleared to play. During the Wild Card Round at home against the Los Angeles Chargers, in which the Ravens were trailing as much as 23–3 due to early struggles by Jackson, many fans chanted for Flacco to return to the field and replace Jackson. Flacco would not see action in the game, as Jackson's late comeback bid down 23–17 was stopped following a fumble with 0:28 remaining in the fourth quarter. Overall, Flacco finished the season with 2,465 passing yards, 12 touchdowns, and 6 interceptions.

Denver Broncos
On February 13, 2019, the Ravens agreed to trade Flacco to the Denver Broncos in exchange for their fourth-round pick in the 2019 NFL Draft. The deal became official on March 13, 2019.

In his Broncos debut, Flacco threw for 268 yards and a touchdown in a 24-16 road loss to the Oakland Raiders. Flacco made his debut at Empower Field at Mile High in Week 2 against the Chicago Bears. In the game, Flacco threw for 292 yards, one touchdown, and one interception as the Broncos lost 16–14. With 31 seconds left in the game, Flacco threw a seven-yard touchdown pass and a two-point conversion, both to wide receiver Emmanuel Sanders to take a 14–13 lead. However, the Bears quickly drove down the field and Eddy Piñeiro kicked a 53-yard game winning field goal, spoiling Flacco's home debut. In Week 4 against the Jacksonville Jaguars, Flacco threw for 303 yards, three touchdowns, and one interception in the 26–24 loss. In Week 5 against the Los Angeles Chargers, Flacco threw for 182 yards, one touchdown, and one interception as the Broncos won their first game of the season by a score of 20–13. In Week 7 against the Kansas City Chiefs, Flacco threw for 213 yards. During the game, Flacco was sacked a career high nine times in a single game. In a Week 8 loss to the Indianapolis Colts, Flacco threw for 174 yards in the 15-13 loss. In the game, he suffered a neck injury which prematurely ended his season. Flacco finished the 2019 season posting 1,822 passing yards, six touchdowns, five interceptions, and an 85.1 passer rating in eight games.

On March 19, 2020, the Broncos released Flacco with a failed physical designation. He underwent neck surgery in April 2020.

New York Jets
On May 27, 2020, Flacco signed a one-year, $1.5 million deal with the New York Jets as the backup quarterback to 2018 first-round pick Sam Darnold. He was placed on the active/physically unable to perform list at the start of training camp on July 30, 2020. He was activated from the list at the start of the regular season on September 5, 2020. Flacco made his Jets debut when he briefly entered the Week 4 matchup on October 2 after starter Sam Darnold injured his shoulder late in the first quarter. He played only four snaps, going 2 for 2 for 16 yards before Darnold returned in the second quarter in the 37–28 loss to the Denver Broncos. On October 7, 2020, Flacco was named the starter against the Arizona Cardinals due to Darnold's shoulder injury. Making his first start with the Jets in Week 5 against the Arizona Cardinals, Flacco finished with 195 passing yards and a touchdown as the Jets lost 10–30. In the next game against the Miami Dolphins, Flacco finished with 186 passing yards, an interception, and a fumble that he recovered. The Jets again lost 24–0, the first time Flacco had ever been shut out in his NFL career. In Week 9 against the New England Patriots, Flacco was again thrust into the starting role after Darnold re-injured his shoulder the previous week. He had his best game of the season, going 18 for 25 for 262 yards and three touchdowns while also passing Joe Montana for 20th on the all-time passing yards list. However, he also threw a costly fourth quarter interception that allowed the Patriots to rally and eventually beat the Jets 30–27. In Week 11 against the Los Angeles Chargers, Flacco completed 15 of 30 passes for 205 passing yards, two touchdowns, and an interception as the Jets lost 34–28 despite an attempted comeback.

Philadelphia Eagles
On March 25, 2021, Flacco signed a one-year, $3.5 million contract with the Philadelphia Eagles as a backup to 2020 second-round pick Jalen Hurts.

New York Jets (second stint)

2021 season
On October 25, 2021, the Eagles traded Flacco back to the Jets for a conditional sixth-round draft pick, after Jets starting quarterback Zach Wilson suffered a knee injury. Flacco served as a backup to Mike White and Josh Johnson for his first three games back with the Jets, coming into the Week 10 game against the Buffalo Bills in relief of White. He completed all three of his pass attempts for 47 yards and a touchdown. On November 17, 2021, Flacco was named the starting quarterback for the Jets' Week 11 game against the Miami Dolphins. He was placed on the reserve/COVID-19 list by the Jets on November 23 as a close contact with White, who tested positive for COVID-19. Flacco was activated on November 30.

2022 season
On March 16, 2022, Flacco re-signed with the Jets for one year and $3.5 million. He was announced as the starter for the first three weeks of the season due to an injury to starter Zach Wilson. Making the start in Week 1 against his former team, the Baltimore Ravens, Flacco completed 37 of 59 passes for 307 yards, a touchdown, and an interception as the Jets lost 9–24. During Week 2 against the Cleveland Browns, Flacco finished with 307 passing yards and four touchdowns. With 1:22 left of regulation, trailing 30–17, Flacco made a 66-yard touchdown pass to Corey Davis and the Jets successfully executed an onside kick, allowing Flacco to throw another touchdown with 14 seconds left in their 31–30 win. It was his first winning start since the 2019 season.

After watching Mike White and Zach Wilson start from Week 4 until Week 17, Flacco was renamed the starter for the season finale after White was ruled out with five broken ribs.

NFL career statistics

Regular season

Postseason

Awards and highlights
 Super Bowl champion (XLVII)
 Super Bowl MVP (XLVII)
 Pepsi NFL Rookie of the Year (2008)
 3× AFC Offensive Player of the Week (Week 9, 2008; Week 1, 2012; Week 6, 2014)
 2× Pepsi NFL Rookie of the Week (Week 8, 2008; Week 17, 2008)
 NFL Top 100 rankings: #90 (2011), #74 (2012), #19 (2013), #58 (2014), #97 (2015)

NFL records

 First rookie quarterback to win two playoff games
 Second-most combined regular and postseason wins in first three years as a quarterback: 36 (tied with Dan Marino)
 First quarterback to start and win a playoff game in each of his first five seasons (Russell Wilson tied record)
 Most touchdowns in a postseason: 11 (tied with Joe Montana, Kurt Warner and Patrick Mahomes)
 Most touchdowns without an interception in a postseason: 11 (tied with Joe Montana)
 First quarterback to have a passer rating over 100 in all four games of a single postseason
 Most consecutive road playoff games with at least two passing touchdowns: 5
 Fastest quarterback to record five touchdowns in a game: 16:03

Ravens franchise records

 Most career passing yards – 38,245
 Most career pass completions – 3,599
 Most career pass attempts – 5,670
 Most career passing touchdowns – 212
 Most regular-season wins – 98
 Most postseason wins – 10
 Most consecutive pass completions: 21 vs. Jacksonville Jaguars on September 25, 2016
 Most 300+ passing-yard games, career – 32
 Most 300+ passing-yard games, season – 6 (2012)
 Most 300+ passing-yard games, playoffs – 2
 Most times sacked in a career for a starting quarterback– 290
 Most career fourth-quarter comeback wins – 14
 Most career game-winning drives – 21
 Most game-winning drives in a single season – 4 (2010) (tied with Elvis Grbac)
 Most passing yards in a single season – 4,317 (2016)
 Most pass completions in a single season – 436 (2016)
 Most pass attempts in a single season – 672 (2016)

Endorsements
Flacco signed a three-year contract with Reebok as a rookie in 2008. In 2009–2010, Flacco was a spokesperson for Pizza Hut, which sold a product called "Flacco's Favorites". Flacco has also endorsed Nike and 1st Mariner Bank, as well as Haribo since January 2013. Also in 2013, Flacco signed an endorsement deal with McDonald's to promote their new menu item, the Mighty Wings. Flacco has also teamed up with opendorse to promote a Zynga mobile application called "NFL Showdown: Football Manager" as well as a line of women's apparel for Spirit Football Jersey.

Personal life
Flacco married his wife Dana in 2011. Together they have five children; their first child, a son, was born in June 2012. Their second son was born September 15, 2013, about an hour before the start of the Ravens' home opener. Their third son was born in January 2015 and their fourth son was born in April 2018. The Flaccos' only daughter was born in September 2016.

While playing for the Ravens, Flacco lived in the Baltimore suburb of Reisterstown, Maryland until selling his home for $1.6 million in 2019 after being traded to the Denver Broncos.

Flacco is the oldest of the five boys in his family. His brothers are named Mike, John, Brian, and Tom, and he also has a sister named Stephanie. His brother Mike was selected in the 31st round of the 2009 Major League Baseball draft by the Baltimore Orioles. Another brother, John, was a walk-on receiver with the Stanford Cardinal football team. Joe's youngest brother, Tom Flacco, enrolled in 2015 at Western Michigan University, where he played quarterback for two seasons before transferring to Rutgers in 2017 and then Towson in 2018. In 2021, Tom was signed by the Saskatchewan Roughriders of the Canadian Football League.

In a survey by Fanatics in January 2017, Flacco was elected as the most attractive player in the NFL.

In 2018, Flacco made a donation of an undisclosed amount to University of Delaware athletics. It was the largest donation from a Delaware alumnus in the NFL.

See also
List of National Football League career passing yards leaders

References

External links

 
 New York Jets bio
 Delaware Fightin' Blue Hens bio

1985 births
Living people
American football quarterbacks
American people of Italian descent
American philanthropists
Audubon High School (New Jersey) alumni
Baltimore Ravens players
Delaware Fightin' Blue Hens football players
Denver Broncos players
New York Jets players
People from Audubon, New Jersey
People from Reistertown, Maryland
Philadelphia Eagles players
Pittsburgh Panthers football players
Players of American football from Baltimore
Players of American football from New Jersey
Sportspeople from Baltimore County, Maryland
Sportspeople from Camden County, New Jersey
Super Bowl MVPs